Eilema arculifera is a moth of the subfamily Arctiinae. It is found in South Africa.

References

Endemic moths of South Africa
arculifera